The Nebraska Army National Guard is a group of Army National Guard units in the U.S. state of Nebraska. The Adjutant General for these units is Major General Daryl L. Bohac, who was announced as the new Deputy Director of the Army National Guard in May, 2013, and assumed his new duties later in 2013.

The state's longtime 67th Infantry Brigade was reorganized in 2003 as the 67th Area Support Group. The brigade was again converted and reorganized in 2008 as the 67th Battlefield Surveillance Brigade. The brigade converted and reorganized again in 2016 as the 67th Maneuver Enhancement Brigade (MEB).

History
The Nebraska Army National Guard was traces its roots to its territorial militia, which was established on December 23, 1854. When it was founded, Nebraska had become a hotspot of unrest and tensions, as its southern neighbor Kansas became embroiled in a civil conflict known as Bleeding Kansas which would later be recognized as the prelude to the American Civil War. Although Nebraska itself was spared from the sectarian violence, its own origins began with a dispute between Mormon settlers in Nebraska and the native Sioux inhabitants of the region, which itself began when a cow owned by the Mormons wandered into Sioux territory and was killed. The Mormons attempted to attack the Sioux after they denied any wrongdoing, which triggered the Grattan massacre. As a result, on Dec. 23, 1854, then acting Governor Thomas Cuming of Nebraska established the Nebraska Territorial Militia, the predecessor to the Nebraska National Guard. The Nebraska Territorial Militia fought in its first conflict during the American Civil War, during which it supplied two volunteer militia units. However, when Nebraska achieved statehood in 1867, the new state did not bother to formally retain a state militia and instead relied on loosely organized, independent ones until 1881 due to costs and expenses. In 1881, the Nebraska Territorial Militia was reorganized into the Nebraska National Guard, and played a role in civil peacekeeping operations, waging conflicts against Native American tribes and being deployed internationally for the first time during the Spanish American War.

Adjutants General of Nebraska

The position of adjutant general was created by the Nebraska Territorial Legislature as a part-time position in 1864. It was made a full-time position in 1869. Its duties were transferred to an additional responsibility of the Secretary of State in 1871. The position was recreated as a full-time position when the state adopted a new military code in 1881.

Daryl L. Bohac, 2013–Present
Judd H. Lyons, 2009-2013
Timothy J. Kadavy, 2007-2009
Roger P. Lempke, 2000-2007
Stanley M. Heng, 1987-2000
James Carmona, 1983-1987
Edward C. Binder, 1978-1983
Francis L. Winner, 1973-1977
Lyle A. Welch, 1959-1973
Guy N. Henninger, 1939-1959
Herbert J. Paul, 1919-1938
Joseph A. Storch, 1919
Hugh E. Clapp, 1917-1919
Walter E. Steele, 1917
Philip L. Hall, 1913-1917
Ernest H. Phelps, 1911-1913
John C. Hartigan, 1909-1911
Charles F. Schwarz, 1907-1909
Jacob H. Culver, 1903-1907
Leonard W. Colby, 1901-1903
Julius N. Killian, 1901
Patrick H. Barry, 1895-1900
James D. Gage, 1893-1895
Victor Vifquain, 1891-1892
Albert V. Cole, 1887-1890
Cyrus N. Baird, 1886-1887
John C. Bonnell, 1885-1886
Edward P. Roggen, 1883-1885
Samuel J. Alexander, 1879-1882
Bruno Tzschuck, 1875-1879
John R. Patrick, 1867-1871
Robert S. Knox, 1865-1867
William H.W. Hughes, 1864-1865

Units 

The Nebraska Army National Guard has one land component command with subordinate elements for mission command. They and their commanders are:

Nebraska Army National Guard Joint Force (HQ at Lincoln)- BG Lynn M. Heng
 1969th Contingency Contracting Team (1969th CCT)
 105th Military History Detachment (105th MHD)

92nd Troop Command (HQ at Lincoln) - COL Gary A. Ropers
 111th Public Affairs Detachment: Lincoln, NE
 43rd Army Band: Lincoln, NE
 195th Quartermaster Detachment (Rigger Support Team) : Yutan, NE
 1st Battalion Support & Security (S&S), 376th Aviation Regiment (UH-72A), 63rd Aviation Brigade
Headquarters and Headquarters Company (HHC) : Grand Island, NE
 Company A (-) : Lincoln, NE
 Company D (-) : Grand Island, NE (UH-72A)
 2nd Battalion, 135th Aviation Regiment - 63d Aviation Brigade 
 Headquarters and Headquarters Company (HHC)
 Detachment 1 : Lincoln, NE
 Detachment 5 : Grand Island, NE
 Company B (-) : Grand Island, NE (CH-47D)
 Company G, 2-104th Aviation Regiment, Combat Aviation Brigade, 28th Infantry Division - PAARNG (Air Ambulance)(UH-60) : Lincoln, NE
 Company D (Maintenance) 
 Detachment 1 : Lincoln, NE
 Detachment 3 : Grand Island, NE
 Company E (Maintenance)
 Detachment 1  : Lincoln, NE
 Detachment 3 : Grand Island, NE
 Company A, 2nd Battalion, 641st Aviation Regiment (C-12) : Lincoln, NE - 63d Aviation Brigade 
 110th Multifunctional Medical Battalion (110th MMB): Lincoln, NE  
 313th Medical Company (Ground Ambulance) : Lincoln, NE 
 1st Squadron, 134th Cavalry Regiment (1-134th Cavalry Regiment): Yutan, NE - 39th Brigade Combat Team
 Headquarters and Headquarters Troop (HHT),1-134th Cavalry Regiment: Yutan, NE
 Troop A : Hastings, NE
 Troop B : Yutan, NE
 Troop C : Beatrice, NE
 Company D, 39th Brigade Support Battalion (1-134th Cavalry FSC) : Yutan, NE - 39th Brigade Support Battalion - 39th Brigade Combat Team
 72nd Civil Support Team: Lincoln, NE
 2nd Battalion (Airborne), 134th Infantry Regiment; subordinate to the 45th Infantry Brigade Combat Team (Oklahoma Army National Guard) 
 Headquarters and Headquarters Company (HHC)
 A Company
 B Company
 C Company (Indiana Army National Guard)
 D Company (Weapons)
 I Forward Support Company/700th Brigade Support Battalion (formerly 195th Forward Support Company)

67th Maneuver Enhancement Brigade (67th MEB) of Lincoln - COL Todd D. Stevens
234th Brigade Signal Company (234th BSC): Lincoln
734th Brigade Support Battalion (734th BSB): Kearney, NE
 267th Ordnance Company: Lincoln, NE
 1075th Transportation Company (Truck): North Platte, NE
 Detachment 1: Sidney, NE
 Detachment 2: McCook, NE
 Detachment 3: Broken Bow, NE
 189th Transportation Company (Truck) : Norfolk, NE   
 Detachment 1 : Wayne, NE   
 Detachment 2 : Columbus, NE
402nd Military Police Battalion (Combat Support): Omaha, NE
 192nd Military Police Detachment (192nd MPD) (Law and Order) : Omaha, NE
 1057th Military Police Company (1057th MPC): Chadron, NE
 Detachment 1 : Scottsbluff, NE
 Detachment 2 : Grand Island, NE
 126th Chemical Battalion: Omaha, NE
 754th Chemical Company (Recon/Decon) : Omaha, NE
 128th Engineer Battalion: Hastings, NE
 755th Engineer Company (Fire Fighting) : Columbus, NE
 181st Engineer Team (Fire Fighting) : Norfolk, NE
 281st Engineer Team (Fire Fighting) : Hastings, NE  
 317th Engineer Team (Fire Fighting) : Norfolk, NE
 617th Engineer Team (Fire Fighting) : Hastings, NE 
 623d Engineer Company (Vertical) : Wahoo, NE  
 Detachment 1 : York, NE

209th Regiment (Regional Training Institute) (HQ at Camp Ashland) - COL Shane Martin
 1st Battalion (Noncommissioned Officer Academy)
 2nd Battalion (Warrant Officer Candidate School)
 3rd Battalion (88M Military Occupational Specialty School)

Historic units
  67th Maneuver Enhancement Brigade - As the 67th Infantry Brigade, the brigade was initially formed in August 1917 in the Iowa and Nebraska Army National Guards, and was part of the 34th Division mobilized for World War I.
  134th Infantry Regiment
  167th Cavalry Regiment - The regiment was constituted on February 12, 1964 as a CARS parent regiment, consisting of Troop E-167 CAV, an element of the 67th Infantry Brigade. Reorganised 1 October 1985 to comprise 1st Squadron, an element of the 35th Infantry Division. Transferred from CARS to USARS headquarters in Lincoln on 1 June 1989. The 1-167th Cavalry was re-organized into the 1st Squadron, 134th Cavalry (R&S) in 2008.
 168th Field Artillery Regiment (formerly 3rd Battalion, 134th Infantry)
  195th Armored Regiment - The Regiment was constituted 20 June 1946 as the 128th Engineer Combat Battalion and allocated to the Nebraska ARNG as a component of the 34th Infantry Division. Organized and federally recognized on 20 November 1947 with headquarters at Omaha, elements organized from new and existing companies. Reorganized and redesignated 1 February 1953 as the 128th Engineer Battalion. Location of headquarters changed 1 May 1959 to Kearny. Relieved 1 April 1963 from assigned to the 34th Infantry Division. Converted, reorganized, and redesignated 1 May 1968 as the 195th Armor, a parent regiment under CARS, consisting of the 1st Battalion. 1 November 1978 assigned to the 67th Infantry Brigade. Reallocated to the 35th Infantry Division on 1 October 1985. 1 June 1989 reallocated from CARS to United States Army Regimental System. Globalsecurity.org reports that "[t]he 195th Armor Battalion (sic) of the Nebraska National Guard, a subordinate unit of the 67th Infantry Brigade, deactivated on Sunday September 2, 2001. Its elements were redesignated as the 734th Transportation Battalion (Motor Support)."

See also
Nebraska State Guard

References

External links 
Camp Cody - Nebraska National Guard WW1

 
United States Army National Guard by state
Military in Nebraska